Johan Gert Meyer (born 26 February 1993 in Port Elizabeth, South Africa) is a South African born rugby union player, currently playing with Italian side Zebre in the Pro14 and European Rugby Challenge Cup, and for the Italian national team after qualifying through residency. His regular position is flanker or number eight.

Youth 

In 2006, he played for their Under-13 side at the Craven Week competition. He played for them at two Under-18 Craven Week competitions – in 2010 and again in 2011, when he scored three tries for the Border U18 side, including two in their match against  Country Districts.

After school, Meyer moved to Durban where he joined the  Academy. He was a member of the  squad that played in the 2012 Under-19 Provincial Championship (although he never played for them) and the  squads in 2013 and 2014.

Sharks 

He was once again involved in the  2014 Vodacom Cup campaign, this time appearing in all eight of their matches; four times in the run-on side and four times off the bench.

Zebre 

Meyer joined Italian Pro12 side Zebre for the 2015–16 Pro12 season. He played 17 games, starting 16, playing 1269 minutes, scoring 3 tries contributing 15-point in the Pro 12 series.
 He played 5 games in the European Rugby Challenge Cup contributing 5 points.

International
He has represented Italy since 2018, qualifying on residency grounds.

References

1993 births
Living people
Italian rugby union players
Italy international rugby union players
Rugby union flankers
Rugby union number eights
Rugby union players from Port Elizabeth
Sharks (Currie Cup) players
South African rugby union players
Zebre Parma players